The 2018–19 Burundi Ligue A season, also known as Primus Ligue for sponsorship reasons, was the 56th edition of the top flight football competition in Burundi. The season began on 17 August 2018 and ended on 27 April 2019.

Teams 
A total of sixteen clubs participate in this season. Thirteen teams from previous season and three new promoted sides.

Promoted from Ligue B
 Bumamuru
 Rukinzo
 Kayanza United

Relegated from Ligue A
 Inter Star
 Les Jeunes Athlétiques
 Delta Star Gatumba

League table

References

Burundi Premier League seasons
Premier League
Premier League
Burundi